The term Number C (or C number) is an old nomenclature used by Paul Dirac which refers to real and complex numbers.  It is used to distinguish from operators (q-numbers or quantum numbers) in quantum mechanics.

Although c-numbers are commuting, the term anti-commuting c-number is also used to refer to a type of anti-commuting numbers that are mathematically described by Grassmann numbers. The term is also used to refer solely to "commuting numbers" in at least one major textbook.

References

External links 
 WordWeb Online 

Numbers
Quantum mechanics